The Shipt Tower is a 34-story,  tall office building in Birmingham, Alabama. Built in 1986 as the corporate headquarters for SouthTrust Corporation, the building was known as the SouthTrust Tower until 2005, when SouthTrust completed its merger with Wachovia and it became the Wachovia Tower. It became the Wells Fargo Tower in September 2010 after Wells Fargo completed its purchase of Wachovia and a new logo was placed atop the building. Shipt, a local start-up and subsidiary of the Target Corporation announced in January 2019 that it would become the anchor tenant of the building in 2020. The Tower was rebranded as the Shipt Tower on May 23, 2020,  when corporate signage was placed atop the tower.

History 

The building was developed by Johnston-Rast & Hays and designed by architects Skidmore, Owings & Merrill and Giattina, Fisher & Aycock. Brice Building Company was the contractor for the project. It displaced the First National Bank Building in Mobile as the tallest building in Alabama and held that distinction until 2006, when the RSA Battle House Tower in Mobile surpassed it.

Today, the building's largest tenant is law firm Burr & Forman. It is also a regional headquarters for Wells Fargo, the second largest tenant, and home to the Birmingham office of Baker, Donelson, Bearman, Caldwell & Berkowitz and Deloitte.

See also
List of tallest buildings in Birmingham, Alabama

References

External links
Wachovia Tower site 

Skyscraper office buildings in Birmingham, Alabama
Office buildings completed in 1986
Skidmore, Owings & Merrill buildings
Bank buildings in Alabama
Wells Fargo buildings
1986 establishments in Alabama